Sarim (or) is a Thai dessert. It consists of colourful (usually pink and green) thin noodles made from mung bean flour in coconut milk and syrup, served cold with crushed ice. The dish is mentioned in the Kap He Chom Khrueang Khao Wan poem of King Rama II (r. 1809 – 1824), though back then it was seasoned with patchouli rather than served with ice.

See also 
Salim (Thai slang), a political slur originating from the dessert's name

References

Thai desserts and snacks